Yuki, Hiroshima may refer to:

Yuki, Hiroshima (Saeki), Japan
Yuki, Hiroshima (Jinseki), Japan